Lyle may refer to:

People

Surname
 Lyle (surname)

Given name
 Lyle Alzado (1949–1992), American NFL All-Pro football player
 Lyle Beerbohm (born 1979), professional mixed martial arts fighter
 Lyle Bennett (1903–2005), head coach of the Central Michigan college football program from 1947 to 1949
 Lyle Berman (born 1941), professional poker player and business executive
 Lyle Bettger (1915–2003), character actor known most for his Hollywood roles from the 1950s
 Lyle Bigbee (1893–1942), outfielder, pitcher and halfback
 Lyle Blackwood (born 1951), played in the National Football League with the Miami Dolphins
 Lyle Boren (1909–1992), Democratic member of the U.S. House of Representatives from Oklahoma
 Lyle Bouck (1923–2016), lieutenant of the I&R Platoon of the 394th Infantry Regiment of the 99th Infantry Division in World War II
 Lyle Bradley (born 1943), former ice hockey center
 Lyle Campbell (born 1942), linguist and leading expert on American Indian languages
 Lyle Craker, professor in the department of Plant, Soil and Insect Sciences at the University of Massachusetts
 Lyle Green (born 1976), fullback for the BC Lions of the Canadian Football League
 Lyle Hanson (1935-2020), American politician from North Dakota
 Lyle W. Hillyard (born 1940), American politician and attorney from Utah
 Lyle Kessler, American playwright and screenwriter
 Lyle Franklin Lane (1926–2013), United States diplomat
 Lyle H. Lanier (1903–1988), American experimental psychologist, university professor and administrator.
 Lyle Larson (born 1959), American politician
 Lyle Lovett (born 1957), American singer-songwriter and actor
 Lyle Martin (born 1985), American soccer player for the Vancouver Whitecaps
 Lyle Mays (1953–2020), American jazz pianist and composer
 Lyle and Erik Menendez (born 1971), convicted for the shotgun murders in 1989 of their parents in Beverly Hills, California
 Lyle Mouton (born 1969), former professional baseball player
 Lyle Neff (born 1969), poet and journalist in Vancouver, British Columbia
 Lyle Oberg (born 1960), Albertan politician and former member of the Legislative Assembly
 Lyle Odelein (born 1968), retired hockey player in the National Hockey League
 Lyle Overbay (born 1977), American baseball player
 Lyle Owerko, filmmaker and photographer
 Lyle Preslar, American musician: guitar player and songwriter for the hardcore punk band Minor Threat
 Lyle Rains, senior executive at the arcade game company Atari
 Lyle Reifsnider (1901–1980), set decorator who worked in Hollywood films from 1946 to 1962
 Lyle Saxon (1891–1946), New Orleans journalist who reported for The Times-Picayune
 Lyle F. Schoenfeldt (born 1939), American business management professor
 Lyle Sendlein (born 1984), American football center for the Arizona Cardinals
 Lyle Smith (1916–2017), assistant coach and head coach of the Boise State college football program
 Lyle M. Spencer (1911–1968), founder of Science Research Associates (SRA) and The Spencer Foundation
 Lyle Stewart (born 1951), Canadian provincial politician
 Lyle Stuart (1922–2006), American author and independent publisher of controversial books
 Lyle Talbot (1902–1996), American actor best known for playing Joe Randolph on The Adventures of Ozzie and Harriet
 Lyle Taylor (born 1991), footballer
 Lyle Tayo (1889–1971), American film actress
 Lyle Tuttle (1931–2019), American tattoo artist and historian
 Lyle Vanclief (born 1943), PC, Canada's Minister of Agriculture from 1997 to 2003
 Lyle Waggoner (born 1935), American actor and former model
 Lyle R. Wheeler (1905–1990), American Academy Award-winning motion picture art director
 Lyle Wicks (1912–2004), British Columbia politician
 Lyle Williams (1942–2008), U.S. representative from Ohio
 Lyle Workman, American guitarist, composer and music producer
 Lyle Wright, (1898–1963), United States Hockey Hall of fame inductee
 Lyle Yorks (born 1982), retired American soccer midfielder

Places

United Kingdom 

 Lyle Hill, viewpoint in Greenock, Inverclyde, Scotland

United States 

 Lyle, Kansas
 Lyle, Minnesota, city in Mower County
 Lyle Township, Mower County, Minnesota
 Lyle, Washington, census-designated place in Klickitat County

Other uses
 Lord Lyle, an extinct Lordship of Parliament in the Peerage of Scotland
 Lyle baronets, three baronetcies in the Lyle family, all created in the Baronetage of the UK
 Lyle guitars, made in Japan in the Matsumoku guitar factory
 Lyle gun, a line-throwing gun for rescue
 Lyle, Lyle, Crocodile, children's book written by Bernard Waber
 "Lyle the Kindly Viking", an episode of VeggieTales
 Lyle & Scott, Scottish clothing brand, mainly known for their high quality knitwear
 Lyle's flying fox, species of bat in the family Pteropodidae
 Tate & Lyle, UK-based multinational agri-processor
 Lyle (film), a 2014 American drama film
 Lyle, a character in the 2003 film The Italian Job
 Lyle, a character in the 2004 film Napoleon Dynamite
 Lyle Lanley, the villain in The Simpsons episode "Marge vs. the Monorail"
 Lyle Norg, the first Invisible Kid in DC Comics

See also
 Lyall (disambiguation)
 Lyell (disambiguation)
 Lile (disambiguation)
 Lisle (disambiguation)
 Delisle (disambiguation)

English masculine given names
English-language surnames